Melaleuca protrusa is a shrub in the myrtle family, Myrtaceae, and is endemic to the south-west of Western Australia. It is a shrub with papery bark, narrow leaves with a hooked end and cream-coloured or yellow flowers. Although it was described as late as 2010, it is not considered a rare or endangered species. It resembles other members of the brushwood group such as M. uncinata,  M. atroviridis and M. zeteticorum.

Description

The flowers are cream to yellow and are arranged in heads at the ends of branches which continue to grow after flowering and sometimes on the sides of branches. The stamens are arranged in five bundles around the flowers and each bundle contains 3 to 5 stamens.

Taxonomy and naming
Melaleuca protrusa was first described in 2010 by Lyndley Craven and Brendan Lepschi in the journal Nuytsia. The specific epithet (protrusa) is derived from the Latin protrudo meaning to "push forward" or "thrust out" referring to the way the individual fruits protrude from the clusters.

Distribution and habitat
Melaleuca protrusa occurs in and between the districts of Mullewa, Dalwallinu, Sandstone and Southern Cross in the Avon Wheatbelt, Coolgardie and Murchison biogeographic regions where it grows in mallee thicket in sandy or clay loam over granite.

Conservation
This melaleuca is classified as "not threatened" by the Government of Western Australia Department of Parks and Wildlife.

Uses
This species contains the monoterpenoid essential oil, 1,8-cineole (Eucalyptol). Owing to its similarities to M. uncinata, it may be suitable for brushwood production.

References

protrusa
Myrtales of Australia
Plants described in 2010
Endemic flora of Western Australia
Taxa named by Lyndley Craven